Let the Thunder of Victory Rumble! may refer to:
 Let the Thunder of Victory Rumble! (anthem), a historical anthem of the Russian Empire
 Let the Thunder of Victory Rumble! (novel), a novel by Boris Akunin